The Big Lagoon Rancheria is a federally recognized tribe of Yurok and Tolowa Indians. They are located in Humboldt County, California, and their tribal headquarters is in Arcata, California.

Government
The tribe was first recognized by the US federal government on 10 July 1918. Tribal enrollment is based on a minimum of 1/8 blood quantum and lineal descent from the Plan of Distribution on the Assets of the Big Lagoon Rancheria, created January 3, 1968. The tribe has 24 enrolled members.

Reservation

The Big Lagoon Rancheria was established in 1918. It also lies adjacent to the unincorporated community of Big Lagoon, California. Eight households reside on the reservation. The tribe has been able to improve the local water facilities and road system on the reservation. As of the 2010 Census the population was 17.

Education
The ranchería is served by the Big Lagoon Union Elementary School District and Northern Humboldt Union High School District.

Economic development
Due to the highly sensitive environment of the reservation, the tribe has agreed with the state of California to not develop the reservation. Instead the tribe has partnered with the Los Coyotes Band of Cahuilla and Cupeño Indians to operate the Barstow Casino and Resort in Barstow, California.

The historical Arcata Hotel in Arcata is owned and operated by the Big Lagoon Rancheria.

See also

 List of Indian reservations in the United States

Notes

References
 Pritzker, Barry M. A Native American Encyclopedia: History, Culture, and Peoples. Oxford: Oxford University Press, 2000. .

External links
 Constitution of the Big Lagoon Rancheria

Tolowa
Yurok
Federally recognized tribes in the United States
Native American tribes in California
American Indian reservations in California
Native Americans in Humboldt County, California
1918 establishments in California
Populated coastal places in California